USS Tigress has been the name of more than one United States Navy ship, and may refer to:

 , a schooner commissioned in 1813 and captured by the British in 1814
 , a steamer acquired in 1861 and lost in 1862
 , a steamer in service from May to November 1873
 , a patrol boat in commission from 1917 to 1918 or 1919

United States Navy ship names